Gurneyite is a term assigned to certain members of the Religious Society of Friends, or Quakers.  The name originates because of the sympathy of the views of these Friends with the ideas of Joseph John Gurney, an English Quaker minister.  In general, Gurneyite Quakers follow evangelical Christian doctrines on Jesus Christ, the Atonement, and the Bible.  Orthodox Quakers separated into Gurneyites and Wilburites, beginning in the 1840s in North America.

English Friends, who suffered no major divisions, recognized American Gurneyites as legitimate Quakers.  Most Gurneyite Friends joined to form the Five Years Meeting of Friends (now Friends United Meeting) in 1902.  Among Gurneyite Yearly Meetings, only Ohio Yearly Meeting declined to join.  Later, other Yearly Meetings withdrew from the Five Years Meeting.  These dissidents eventually formed what is now known as Evangelical Friends Church International.  Today, the ideological descendants of the Gurneyites comprise a majority of the world's Quakers and can be found in North America, Africa, South Asia, East Asia, and Latin America.

History of Quakerism